Space Shuttle Atlantis (Orbiter Vehicle designation: OV‑104) is a Space Shuttle orbiter vehicle which belongs to NASA, the spaceflight and space exploration agency of the United States. Atlantis was manufactured by the Rockwell International company in Southern California and was delivered to the Kennedy Space Center in Eastern Florida in April 1985. Atlantis is also the fourth operational and the second-to-last Space Shuttle built. Its maiden flight was STS-51-J made from October 3 to 7, 1985.

Atlantis embarked on its 33rd and final mission, also the final mission of a space shuttle, STS-135, on July 8, 2011. STS-134 by Endeavour was expected to be the final flight before STS-135 was authorized in October 2010. STS-135 took advantage of the processing for the STS-335 Launch on Need mission that would have been necessary if STS-134's crew became stranded in orbit. Atlantis landed for the final time at the Kennedy Space Center on July 21, 2011.

Atlantis is named after RV Atlantis, a two-masted sailing ship that operated as the primary research vessel for the Woods Hole Oceanographic Institution from 1930 to 1966.

Construction milestones

Specifications 

 Weight (with three shuttle main engines): 
 Length: 
 Height: 
 Wingspan: 
 Atlantis was completed in about half the time it took to build .
 When it rolled out of the Palmdale assembly plant, weighing , Atlantis was nearly  lighter than Columbia.

Missions 
Space Shuttle Atlantis lifted off on its maiden voyage STS-51-J on October 3, 1985. This was the second shuttle mission that was a dedicated Department of Defense mission. It flew one other mission, STS-61-B (the second shuttle night launch) before the Challenger disaster temporarily grounded the shuttle fleet in 1986. Among the five Space Shuttles flown into space, Atlantis conducted a subsequent mission in the shortest time after the previous mission (turnaround time) when it launched in November 1985 on STS-61-B, only 50 days after its previous mission, STS-51-J in October 1985. Atlantis was then used for ten flights from 1988 to 1992. Two of these, both flown in 1989, deployed the planetary probes Magellan to Venus (on STS-30) and Galileo to Jupiter (on STS-34). With STS-30 Atlantis became the first Space Shuttle to launch an interplanetary probe.

During the launch of STS-27 in 1988, a piece of insulation shed from the right solid rocket booster struck the underside of the vehicle, severely damaging over 700 tiles and removing one tile altogether. The crew were instructed to use the remote manipulator system to survey the condition of the underside of the right wing, ultimately finding substantial tile damage. Due to the classified nature of the mission, the only images transferred to the mission control center were encrypted and of extremely poor quality. Mission control personnel deemed the damage to be "lights and shadows" and instructed the crew to proceed with the mission as usual, infuriating many of the crew. Upon landing, Atlantis became the single-most-damaged shuttle to successfully land. The survival of the crew is attributed to a steel L band antenna plate which was positioned directly under the missing tile. A similar situation would eventually lead to the loss of the shuttle Columbia in 2003, albeit on the more critical reinforced carbon-carbon.

During STS-37 in 1991, Atlantis deployed the Compton Gamma Ray Observatory. Beginning in 1995 with STS-71, Atlantis made seven straight flights to the former Russian space station Mir as part of the Shuttle-Mir Program. STS-71 marked a number of firsts in human spaceflight: 100th U.S. crewed space flight; first U.S. Shuttle-Russian Space Station Mir docking and joint on-orbit operations; and first on-orbit change-out of shuttle crew. When linked, Atlantis and Mir together formed the largest spacecraft in orbit at the time.

Atlantis delivered several vital components for the construction of the International Space Station (ISS). During the February 2001 mission STS-98 to the ISS, Atlantis delivered the Destiny Module, the primary operating facility for U.S. research payloads aboard the ISS. The five-hour 25-minute third spacewalk performed by astronauts Robert Curbeam and Thomas Jones during STS-98 marked NASA's 100th extra vehicular activity in space. The Quest Joint Airlock, was flown and installed to the ISS by Atlantis during the mission STS-104 in July 2001. The successful installation of the airlock gave on-board space station crews the ability to stage repair and maintenance spacewalks outside the ISS using U.S. EMU or Russian Orlan space suits. The first mission flown by Atlantis after the Space Shuttle Columbia disaster was STS-115, conducted during September 2006. The mission carried the P3/P4 truss segments and solar arrays to the ISS. On ISS assembly flight STS-122 in February 2008, Atlantis delivered the Columbus laboratory to the ISS. Columbus laboratory is the largest single contribution to the ISS made by the European Space Agency (ESA).

In May 2009 Atlantis flew a seven-member crew to the Hubble Space Telescope for its Servicing Mission 4, STS-125. The mission was a success, with the crew completing five spacewalks totalling 37 hours to install new cameras, batteries, a gyroscope and other components to the telescope. This was the final mission not to rendezvous with the ISS.

The longest mission flown using Atlantis was STS-117, which lasted almost 14 days in June 2007. During STS-117, Atlantis crew added a new starboard truss segment and solar array pair (the S3/S4 truss), folded the P6 array in preparation for its relocation and performed four spacewalks. Atlantis was not equipped to take advantage of the Station-to-Shuttle Power Transfer System so missions could not be extended by making use of power provided by ISS.

During the STS-129 post-flight interview on November 16, 2009, shuttle launch director Mike Leinbach said that Atlantis officially beat Space Shuttle Discovery for the record low amount of interim problem reports, with a total of just 54 listed since returning from STS-125. Leinbach added, "It is due to the team and the hardware processing. They just did a great job. The record will probably never be broken again in the history of the Space Shuttle Program, so congratulations to them."  Leinbach made a similar report during a  post-launch interview on May 14, 2010, saying that there were a total of 46 listed from STS-129 to STS-132.

Orbiter maintenance down periods 
Atlantis went through two overhauls of scheduled orbiter maintenance down periods (OMDPs) during its operational history.

Atlantis arrived at Palmdale, California in October 1992 for OMDP-1. During that visit 165 modifications were made over the next 20 months. These included the installation of a drag chute, new plumbing lines to configure the orbiter for extended duration, improved nose wheel steering, more than 800 new heat tiles and blankets, new insulation for main landing gear, and structural modifications to the airframe.

On November 5, 1997, Atlantis again arrived at Palmdale for OMDP-2 which was completed on September 24, 1998. The 130 modifications carried out during OMDP-2 included glass cockpit displays, replacement of TACAN navigation with GPS and ISS airlock and docking installation. Several weight reduction modifications were performed on the orbiter including replacement of Advanced Flexible Reusable Surface Insulation (AFRSI) insulation blankets on upper surfaces with FRSI. Lightweight crew seats were installed and the Extended Duration Orbiter (EDO) package installed on OMDP-1 was removed to lighten Atlantis to better serve its prime mission of servicing the ISS.

During the standdown period post Columbia accident, Atlantis went through over 75 modifications to the orbiter ranging from very minor bolt change-outs to window change-outs and different fluid systems.

Atlantis was known among the shuttle workforce as being more prone than the others in the fleet to problems that needed to be addressed while readying the vehicle for launch, leading to some nicknaming it "Britney".

Decommissioning 

NASA initially planned to withdraw Atlantis from service in 2008, as the orbiter would have been due to undergo its third scheduled OMDP; the timescale of the final retirement of the shuttle fleet was such that having the orbiter undergo this work was deemed uneconomical. It was planned that Atlantis would be kept in near-flight condition to be used as a spares source for Discovery and Endeavour. However, with the significant planned flight schedule up to 2010, the decision was taken to extend the time between OMDPs, allowing Atlantis to be retained for operations. Atlantis was subsequently swapped for one flight of each Discovery and Endeavour in the flight manifest. Atlantis had completed what was meant to be its last flight, STS-132, prior to the end of the shuttle program, but the extension of the Shuttle program into 2011 led to Atlantis being selected for STS-135, the final Space Shuttle mission in July 2011.

Atlantis is currently displayed at the Kennedy Space Center Visitor Complex. NASA Administrator Charles Bolden announced the decision at an employee event held on April 12, 2011, to commemorate the 30th anniversary of the first shuttle flight: "First, here at the Kennedy Space Center where every shuttle mission and so many other historic human space flights have originated, we'll showcase my old friend, Atlantis".

The Visitor Complex displays Atlantis with payload bay doors opened mounted at a 43.21° angle to give the appearance of being in orbit around the Earth. The mount angle pays tribute to the countdown that preceded every shuttle launch at KSC. A multi-story digital projection of Earth rotates behind the orbiter in a  indoor facility. Ground breaking of the facility occurred in 2012.

The exhibit opened on June 29, 2013.

Crews

A total of 156 individuals flew with Space Shuttle Atlantis over the course of its 33 missions. Because the shuttle sometimes flew crew members arriving and departing Mir and the ISS, not all of them launched and landed on Atlantis.

Astronaut Clayton Anderson, ESA astronaut Leopold Eyharts and Russian cosmonauts Nikolai Budarin and Anatoly Solovyev only launched on Atlantis. Similarly, astronauts Daniel Tani and Sunita Williams, as well as cosmonauts Vladimir Dezhurov and Gennady Strekalov only landed with Atlantis. Only 146 men and women both launched and landed aboard Atlantis.

Some of those people flew with Atlantis more than once. Taking them into account, 203 total seats were filled over Atlantis 33 missions. Astronaut Jerry Ross holds the record for the most flights aboard Atlantis at five.

Astronaut Rodolfo Neri Vela who flew aboard Atlantis on STS-61-B mission in 1985 is the only Mexican to have traveled to space. ESA astronaut Dirk Frimout who flew on STS-45 as a payload specialist was the first Belgian in space. STS-46 mission specialist Claude Nicollier was the first astronaut from Switzerland. On the same flight, astronaut Franco Malerba became the first citizen of Italy to travel to space.

Astronaut Mike Massimino who flew on STS-125 mission became the first person to use Twitter in space in May 2009.

Having flown aboard Atlantis as part of the STS-132 crew in May 2010 and Discovery as part of the STS-133 crew in February/March 2011, Stephen Bowen became the first NASA astronaut to be launched on consecutive missions.

Flights listing

Problems

Composite overwrapped pressure vessels
NASA announced in 2007 that 24 helium and nitrogen gas tanks in Atlantis were older than their designed lifetime. These composite overwrapped pressure vessels (COPV) were designed for a 10-year life and later cleared for an additional 10 years; they exceeded this life in 2005. NASA said it could not guarantee any longer that the vessels on Atlantis would not burst or explode under full pressure. Failure of these tanks could have damaged parts of the orbiter and even wound or kill ground personnel. An in-flight failure of a pressure vessel could have even resulted in the loss of the orbiter and its crew. NASA analyses originally assumed that the vessels would leak before they burst, but new tests showed that they could in fact burst before leaking.

Because the original vendor was no longer in business, and a new manufacturer could not be qualified before 2010, when the shuttles were scheduled to be retired, NASA decided to continue operations with the existing tanks. Therefore, to reduce the risk of failure and the cumulative effects of load, the vessels were maintained at 80 percent of the operating pressure as late in the launch countdown as possible, and the launch pad was cleared of all but essential personnel when pressure was increased to 100 percent. The new launch procedure was employed during some of the remaining launches of Atlantis, but was resolved when the two COPVs deemed to have the highest risk of failure were replaced.

Window damage
After the STS-125 mission, a work light knob was discovered jammed in the space between one of Atlantiss front interior windows and the Orbiter dashboard structure. The knob was believed to have entered the space during flight, when the pressurized Orbiter was expanded to its maximum size. Then, once back on Earth, the Orbiter contracted, jamming the knob in place. Leaving "as-is" was considered unsafe for flight, and some options for removal (including window replacement) would have included a 6-month delay of Atlantiss next mission (planned to be STS-129). Had the removal of the knob been unsuccessful, the worst-case scenario was that Atlantis could have been retired from the fleet, leaving Discovery and Endeavour to complete the manifest alone. The knob was then frozen with dry ice, and successfully removed. Small areas of damage to the window were discovered where the edges of the knob had been embedded into the pane.

Gallery

Tribute and mission insignias

* Mission canceled following the Challenger disaster.

In media
 The 1986 film SpaceCamp involves a crew of students at United States Space Camp that are accidentally launched into space on-board Atlantis.
 The 1990 novel Earth by David Brin includes Atlantis, depicted as stranded on Rapa Nui in tribute to G. Harry Stine's serialized novel Shuttle Down, published in 1980.
 Atlantis is featured in, and destroyed in, the 1998 science-fiction films Deep Impact and Armageddon.
 Atlantis is the setting and title of episode 2 of season 1 of the revived continuation of the TV series Quantum Leap, which features a fictional mission set between the real 1997 and 2000 missions (STS-86 and STS-101).

See also

 List of human spaceflights
 List of Space Shuttle crews
 List of Space Shuttle missions
 STS-135

References

External links

Orbiter Vehicles 
Shuttle Orbiter Atlantis (OV-104)
16 April 2007: Consolidated Launch Manifest: Space Shuttle Flights and ISS Assembly Sequence
Space Shuttle Atlantis: Last Flight – slideshow by Life magazine
Atlantis photo essay From Boston.com.
Transition & Retirement: Hi-res spherical panoramas of the processing
Atlantis StickrBoo

Atlantis
Atlantis
Historic American Engineering Record in Texas
Individual rockets
Individual aircraft

Articles containing video clips